Sveti Srđ was an important market town on the left bank of the river Bojana  away from Skadar in Medieval Serbia and later the Venetian Empire and for short period in the Ottoman Empire. It was a medieval trading center.

Location 
Sveti Srđ emerged near the Benedictine Shirgj Monastery, an abbey dedicated to Sergius and Bacchus built in the 11th century. Due to its favorable geographical position near the mouth of the river Bojana, it grew to surpass other towns of the region.

History 
Since the reign of Stefan Nemanja in the Serbian Grand Principality, Sveti Srđ was one of four markets allowed to trade salt (the other three being Kotor and Drijeva while Dubrovnik joined them after it was established as a republic in the mid 14th century) in the Serbian maritime. Although a lot of wood was transported by Bojana, Sveti Srđ was not a trading place for wood, but instead for salt and leather. It was one of two customs areas of the region (the other one was Danj on the river Drin).

In 1330 near Sveti Srđ, the King of Serbia Stefan Dečanski met with envoys of Dubrovnik who congratulated him on his victory in the Battle of Velbazhd. On that occasion, Dečanski asked them to support his military campaigns with six galleys. After the collapse of the Serbian Empire in 1371, Sveti Srđ belonged to Zeta until 1392 when Ottomans captured Zeta's lord Đurađ II Balšić. They soon released him after they first captured Danj, Skadar and Sveti Srđ. In autumn 1395 Balšić recaptured his towns including Sveti Srđ. Knowing he would not be able to keep those towns if Ottomans decided to capture them he ceded them to the Venetians. Soon, in 1397, Danj was granted the right to trade salt. Thus, the Venetian takeover ended the monopoly on salt trading that Sveti Srđ had held in the Bojana region for centuries while it was in Serbia.

A peace treaty signed in Sveti Srđ in 1423 ended the Second Scutari War waged between the Serbian Despotate (initially Zeta) and the Venetian Republic over Scutari and other former possessions of Zeta controlled by Venice. This treaty is known as the Peace of Sveti Srđ. While it was in Venetian hands the salt traded in Sveti Srđ had to be transported from, also Venetian controlled, Corfu.

In 1479, Ottomans captured the remaining part of the region of northern Albania and this market soon became deserted.

References

Further reading 
 Momčilo Spremić, 'Sveti Srđ pod mletačkom vlašću' [Sveti Srdj under Venetian rule], Zbornik Filozofskog fakulteta u Beogradu 7 (1963), H. 1, 295-312
 

Destroyed cities
Former populated places in Albania
Grand Principality of Serbia
Kingdom of Serbia (medieval)
Serbian Empire
Principality of Zeta
Serbian Despotate
Economy of Serbia in the Middle Ages
Populated places in Shkodër